Eirenis medus is a species of snake of the family Colubridae.

Geographic range
The snake is found in the Iran and Turkmenistan.

References 

Eirenis
Reptiles described in 1940
Reptiles of Iran
Reptiles of Central Asia